Simon Aspelin and Todd Perry were the defending champions, but Aspelin chose not to participate, and only Perry competed that year.
Perry partnered with Jürgen Melzer, but Daniel Nestor and Nenad Zimonjić defeated them 6–1, 7–6(7–3), in the final.

Seeds

Draw

Draw

External links
Draw

2007 Doubles
2007 ATP Tour
2007 in Russian tennis